Maranthalai is a village in Thoothukudi district in the state of Tamil Nadu, India. Authoor is the nearby panchayat town. Thamirabarani River rover flows through Maranthalai, thus serving the village with water.

School 
 TDTA Isaac Duraisamy Nadar High School
 Little Angel School: Closure order issued by Directorate of Elementary Education, Tamil Nadu in 2015

References 

Villages in Thoothukudi district